"Lisa's Wedding" is the nineteenth episode of the sixth season of the American animated television series The Simpsons. It originally aired on the Fox network in the United States on March 19, 1995. The plot focuses on Lisa visiting a carnival fortune teller and learning about her future love. It was written by Greg Daniels and directed by Jim Reardon. Mandy Patinkin guest stars as Hugh Parkfield and Phil Hartman guest stars as Troy McClure. The episode won an Emmy Award in 1995 for Outstanding Animated Program, becoming the third episode of The Simpsons to win the award.

Plot
The Simpson family visit a Renaissance fair, where Lisa finds a fortune-telling booth. The clairvoyant says she will predict Lisa's future and tell the story of her true love.

In the year 2010 – 15 years in the future – 23-year-old Lisa meets a fellow university student named Hugh Parkfield from London. The pair fall madly in love and soon plan to marry. Lisa and Hugh travel to Springfield, where they plan to hold the wedding. Marge is still a housewife, Bart is a 25-year-old who works as a twice divorced building demolition expert (and plans on going to law school), Maggie is a 16-year-old girl who apparently never shuts up (although she never talks in the episode, and whenever she tries to she is interrupted), and Homer still works at the Springfield Nuclear Power Plant (in Sector 7G, with Milhouse as his supervisor). Despite Lisa's hopes, Hugh does not get along with her family; he is particularly dismayed when Homer wants him to wear family-tradition cufflinks resembling pigs on his wedding day.

Lisa begs Hugh to wear the cufflinks, and he agrees on the condition that Lisa abandon her family after the wedding because Hugh is deeply embarrassed by them (except for Marge, who can visit once they have children). Outraged, Lisa insists she cannot marry him if he cannot understand that she loves her family members – despite their shortcomings – and calls off the wedding. Hugh returns to England and never sees Lisa again.

In the present, Lisa questions the fortune-teller about her "true love" and the fortune-teller reveals that although Lisa will have a true love, she specializes in foretelling doomed romances. Lisa leaves the booth and finds Homer, who is excited to tell her about his day at the fair.

Production
The episode was written by Greg Daniels and directed by Jim Reardon. The idea for the episode came from James L. Brooks, who called David Mirkin and pitched the idea as traveling to the future and Lisa meeting the perfect guy, who in turn cannot stand her family. Believing that it would be a tough episode to write, Brooks gave the job to Greg Daniels, who was enthusiastic about it and has said that it was a lot easier and more fun to write than expected. The plot involving Homer's cuff links was not in the original draft; it was later added because the writers felt that something was needed to represent Hugh's disdain for the Simpson family. The end theme was redone by Alf Clausen as a "Renaissance version", including a harp.

Everything in the episode had to be redesigned, including the sets and all the characters. In most cases, the adults were made older, heavier, had a few lines added to the face, and less hair. On Homer, the redesign was minimal, making him a bit heavier, removing one hair and placing an extra line under the eye. In the future, Lisa has frilled, pointed hair, Marge with slightly grayer blue hair, Bart has a beard line like his father, Homer is stouter and even balder, with only one hair on his head and the one wrapping around thinning, and Krusty looks like Groucho Marx. The night sky was intentionally made a more reddish color in a subtle joke about how the producers thought the world would be much more polluted in 2010. Nancy Cartwright's Bart voice was electronically lowered a couple of notches.

This is the first of five future-themed episodes. It was followed by "Bart to the Future" in season 11, "Future-Drama" in season 16, "Holidays of Future Passed" in season 23, and "Days of Future Future" in season 25. While both "Lisa's Wedding" and "Future-Drama" were nominated for an Emmy, in 2003, Entertainment Weekly named "Bart to the Future" the worst episode in the history of the series.

Cultural references
The episode makes mention of "40 classic films starring Jim Carrey" in 2010. According to David Mirkin, this is a joke about how "huge" Carrey's films were at the time, and how he was not garnering much respect as an actor. Lisa wandering away from the Renaissance fair while following a rabbit is similar to the plot of Alice's Adventures In Wonderland. The sounds of the car are the same as the ones used in The Jetsons. On Lisa's wall there is a poster of Rolling Stones Steel Wheelchair Tour 2010. Wrist communicators are using the same sounds as communicators in Star Trek. In this episode's version of the future, apparently three of the major American television networks have been bought by ABC and merged into CNNBCBS. Hugh Parkfield is a parody of English actor Hugh Grant. The beginning of Lisa and Hugh's romance is similar to the one in the 1970 film Love Story. Martin Prince's fate is a parody of The Phantom of the Opera. The song that he plays on the organ is a variation of "A Fifth of Beethoven" by Walter Murphy, a disco version of Beethoven's "Symphony No. 5" in C Minor. Hugh mentions that he and Lisa are "both utterly humorless about our vegetarianism"; in the next season's episode, "Lisa the Vegetarian," Lisa does indeed become a vegetarian and remains one for subsequent episodes.

Reception and legacy

Critical reception
"Lisa's Wedding" won an Emmy Award in 1995 for Outstanding Animated Program, becoming the third episode of The Simpsons to win in the category. This episode is a favorite of James L. Brooks, who believes that it is one of the best-written episodes and ranks near the top of The Simpsons episodes. The emotion of "Lisa's Wedding" is often compared with season two's "Lisa's Substitute". The Quindecim, a college newspaper, made their own top 25 list, ranking "Lisa's Wedding" as the greatest episode of The Simpsons. They also criticized Entertainment Weekly for leaving this episode and "Lisa's Substitute" off their top 25 list, saying it was the "equivalent of leaving the Sistine Chapel off a list of Michelangelo's best work", adding, "Serving well as bookends, these episodes are not only brilliantly funny, they're among the most genuinely touching stories in the show's entire run."

Mandy Patinkin as Hugh is considered one of the best The Simpsons guest spots by Chris Turner in his book Planet Simpson, who says that many of the best The Simpsons guest stars have been lesser known celebrities. In a 2008 article, Entertainment Weekly named Patinkin one of the 16 best The Simpsons guest stars. In 1998, TV Guide listed it as the first in its list of top twelve episodes, calling it "the premier example of what makes a Simpsons episode work." In 2007, The Daily Telegraph characterized the episode as one of "The 10 Best Simpsons TV Episodes".

On August 1, 2010, the day of Lisa's wedding in the episode, the name "Lisa Simpson" was a trending topic on Twitter. Most of the Twitter users that tweeted her name wished her a happy wedding day.

Ratings
In its original broadcast, "Lisa's Wedding" finished 52nd in ratings for the week of March 13–19, 1995, with a Nielsen rating of 9.1, equivalent to approximately 8.7 million viewing households. It was the third highest-rated show on the Fox network that week, following Beverly Hills, 90210 and Melrose Place.

References

Bibliography

External links

 
 

The Simpsons (season 6) episodes
1995 American television episodes
Older versions of cartoon characters
Fiction set in 2010
Television episodes about weddings
Science fiction comedy
Television episodes about precognition
Television episodes set in London
Emmy Award-winning episodes